Nový človek is the debut album by Slovak rapper Majk Spirit released on November 11, 2011 on BeatBan Records. During first six weeks upon its release, the set sold over 6,000 copies in both the Czech Republic and Slovakia.

Track listing

Credits and personnel
 Michal "Majk Spirit" Dušicka - executive producer, lead vocalist, lyrics
 Nironic - backing vocalist
 MadSkill - backing vocalist, mastering, mix
 Orion - backing vocalist
 Delik - backing vocalist
 H16 - backing vocalist
 Celeste Buckingham - backing vocalist

 Cigo - backing vocalist
 Supa - backing vocalist
 DNA - backing vocalist 
 Suvereno - backing vocalist
 Marek Šurin - mastering, mix
 Viktor Hazard - recording
 Marek Rehák - photography, cover art design

 Michal Matejovič - media management
 Michal Švihra - executive producer
 Daniela Grečnerová - executive producer
 FatMusic Studio - recording studio
 BeatBan Records - record label, distributor
 Spirit Music - copyright
 OnStage Ltd. - distributor

Charts

Singles

Release history

See also
 European hip hop
 Celeste Buckingham discography
 The 100 Greatest Slovak Albums of All Time

References
General

Specific

External links 
 MajkSpirit.sk > Profile > Nový človek

2011 albums
Majk Spirit albums
Slovak-language albums